Willard I. Bowerman Jr. (May 3, 1917September 22, 1987) was a Michigan politician.

Early life
Bowerman was born in Lansing, Michigan on May 3, 1917.

Education
Bowerman graduated from Lansing Central High School. Bowerman earned an AB from Michigan State University in 1939 and an LL.B. from the University of Michigan Law School in 1947.

Career
Bowerman held a number of legal positions, including chief assistant prosecutor of Ingham County, assistant city attorney of Lansing, and the Ingham County and State Bar associations. Bowerman served on the Lansing city council for two terms. On November 4, 1952, Bowerman was elected to the Michigan House of Representatives where he represented the Ingham County 1st district from January 14, 1953 to December 31, 1960. Bowerman served as mayor of Lansing from 1961 to 1965. Bowerman was not re-elected in 1965. After his mayorship, Bowerman went on to serve on the Workmen's Compensation Commission appeal board.

Personal life
On August 25, 1947, Bowerman married Carolyn C. Hawks. Together, they had three children. Bowerman was a member of the Plymouth Congregational Church.

Death
Bowerman died on September 22, 1987 in Lansing. Bowerman was interred at Mount Hope Cemetery in Lansing.

References

1917 births
1987 deaths
Burials in Michigan
Michigan city council members
Michigan lawyers
Michigan State University alumni
University of Michigan Law School alumni
Mayors of Lansing, Michigan
Republican Party members of the Michigan House of Representatives
20th-century American lawyers
20th-century American politicians